Eastwood may refer to:

Places
in Australia
Eastwood, New South Wales 
Eastwood railway station
Electoral district of Eastwood
Eastwood, South Australia

in Canada
Eastwood, Ontario
Eastwood, Edmonton, Alberta, a neighborhood

in the Philippines
Eastwood City

in South Africa
Eastwood, Pretoria, a suburb of Pretoria, Gauteng Province.

in the UK
England
Eastwood, Essex
Eastwood, Herefordshire
Eastwood, Nottinghamshire
Eastwood, West Yorkshire
Eastwood (L&Y) railway station
Scotland
Eastwood, Strathclyde, historic local government district
Eastwood (UK Parliament constituency), a former constituency of the Parliament of the United Kingdom, now known as East Renfrewshire (UK Parliament constituency)
Eastwood (Scottish Parliament constituency), a constituency of the Scottish Parliament
Eastwood, Glasgow, neighbourhood

in the USA
Eastwood, California
Eastwood, Florida
Eastwood, Louisiana
Eastwood, Michigan
Eastwood, Missouri
Eastwood, New Jersey, a borough between 1894 and 1896
Eastwood, Ohio
Neighborhoods:
Eastwood, Louisville, Kentucky
Eastwood, Syracuse, New York
Eastwood, Dallas, Texas
Eastwood, Houston, Texas

Other uses
Eastwood (surname)
Eastwood School (disambiguation)
EastwoodCo
Eastwood (album), the 2003 Cuban Boys' album
Eastwood Guitars